The 1998 WNBA season was the first for the Washington Mystics.

Offseason

Initial Player Allocation

Expansion Draft

WNBA Draft

Regular season

Season standings

Season schedule

Player Stats

‡ = Waived during the season

Awards and honors

References

External links
Washington Mystics on Basketball Reference

Washington
Washington Mystics seasons
Washington Mystics